Katyn list may refer to:
Lists of Polish citizens killed at particular locations of the Katyn massacre
Ukrainian Katyn List, the list of people killed during the Katyn massacre in the territory of Ukraine
Belarusian Katyn List, the list of people killed during the Katyn massacre in the territory of Belarus
Lista Katyńska. Jeńcy obozów Kozielsk, Ostaszków, Starobielsk. Zaginieni w Rosji Sowieckiej, a 1949 book by